Heterolinyphia is a genus of Asian dwarf spiders that was first described by J. Wunderlich in 1973.  it contains only two species, both found in Bhutan, India, and Nepal: H. secunda and H. tarakotensis.

See also
 List of Linyphiidae species (A–H)

References

Araneomorphae genera
Linyphiidae
Spiders of Asia